Goodenia pascua is a species of flowering plant in the family Goodeniaceae and is endemic to the north-west of Western Australia. It is an ascending to erect herb with bristly hairs, and with narrow elliptic to lance-shaped leaves at the base of the plant and racemes of yellow flowers.

Description

Taxonomy and naming
Goodenia pascua was first formally described in 1990 Roger Charles Carolin in the journal Telopea from a specimen he collected on the road between Port Hedland and Roebourne in 1970. The specific epithet (pascua) means "relating to pasture", referring to the grassy habitat of this species.

Distribution and habitat
This goodenia grows in grassy woodland on black soil plains in the Carnarvon, Gascoyne, Pilbara biogeographic regions of north-western Western Australia.

Conservation status
Goodenia pascua is classified as "not threatened" by the Government of Western Australia Department of Parks and Wildlife.

References

pascua
Eudicots of Western Australia
Plants described in 1990
Taxa named by Roger Charles Carolin
Endemic flora of Australia